Ollie Wilkinson (born 4 October 1944) is a former Irish Fianna Fáil politician. He was a Teachta Dála (TD) for Waterford from 2002 to 2007. Wilkinson was elected to Dáil Éireann at the 2002 general election, but lost his seat at the 2007 general election. He was an unsuccessful candidate for Waterford County Council at the 2009 local elections.

References

 

1944 births
Living people
Fianna Fáil TDs
Members of the 29th Dáil
Irish farmers